"Zai Na Yaoyuan De Difang" is the title and first line of a Chinese song written by Wang Luobin, a Chinese songwriter and ethnic music researcher.

History
Wang Luobin wrote the song in 1939 in Qinghai while shooting a film near Qinghai Lake.  He met a young Tibetan girl, and wrote a song about the beautiful impression that she left upon him and all those around her.  The song is set to the tune of Qayran jalğan - a Kazakh folk song - that Wang had collected in the area.

It became one of the most popular songs in China and one of the best known Chinese songs in many countries. Wang Luobin first named this song as "The Grassland Love Song", but the song has later become better known by its first line of the lyrics, "Zai Na Yaoyuan De Difang". The song is extremely popular in Japan where it is called .

Various English-language sources use different translations of the song's title. China Daily, Ministry of Culture of China, China Central Television, and China Radio International translated the name into "In That Place Wholly Faraway".
Beijing Review and a Newcastle University academic Joanna Smith Finley translated it into "In That Faraway Place".
Xinhua News Agency translated it into "In a Faraway Fairyland".
WaterFire, University of Queensland, and Scotland-China Association translated it into "In That Distant Place".
Su Xiaokang translated it into "In a Land Far Far Away".
A University of Toronto academic Joshua D. Pilzer translated it into "In That Far-Off Land".
An Indian historian Sarvepalli Gopal translated it into "In That Remote Place".

References

External links
 English vocal version

Chinese folk songs
Chinese-language songs
1939 songs